Zhu Hongjun (born August 18, 1981 in Liaoning) is a Chinese race walker.

Achievements

References

1981 births
Living people
Athletes (track and field) at the 2004 Summer Olympics
Chinese male racewalkers
Olympic athletes of China
Athletes from Liaoning
Athletes (track and field) at the 2002 Asian Games
Asian Games competitors for China